The turbofan or fanjet is a type of airbreathing jet engine that is widely used in aircraft propulsion. The word "turbofan" is a portmanteau of "turbine" and "fan": the turbo portion refers to a gas turbine engine which achieves mechanical energy from combustion, and the fan, a ducted fan that uses the mechanical energy from the gas turbine to force air rearwards. Thus, whereas all the air taken in by a turbojet passes through the combustion chamber and turbines, in a turbofan some of that air bypasses these components. A turbofan thus can be thought of as a turbojet being used to drive a ducted fan, with both of these contributing to the thrust.

The ratio of the mass-flow of air bypassing the engine core to the mass-flow of air passing through the core is referred to as the bypass ratio. The engine produces thrust through a combination of these two portions working together; engines that use more jet thrust relative to fan thrust are known as low-bypass turbofans, conversely those that have considerably more fan thrust than jet thrust are known as high-bypass. Most commercial aviation jet engines in use today are of the high-bypass type, and most modern military fighter engines are low-bypass. Afterburners are used on low-bypass turbofan engines with bypass and core mixing before the afterburner.

Modern turbofans have either a large single-stage fan or a smaller fan with several stages. An early configuration combined a low-pressure turbine and fan in a single rear-mounted unit.

Principles

The turbofan was invented to improve the fuel consumption of the turbojet. It would do this by increasing the mass and lowering the speed of the propelling jet compared to that of the turbojet. This would be done mechanically by adding a ducted fan rather than using viscous forces by adding an ejector, as first envisaged by Whittle.

Frank Whittle envisioned flight speeds of 500 mph in writing his UK patent 471,368 "Improvements relating to the propulsion of aircraft", filed in March 1936, and in which he describes the principles behind the turbofan, although not called as such at that time. The turbojet uses the gas from its thermodynamic cycle as its propelling jet. There are two penalties for using the cycle gas for the propelling jet for aircraft speeds of 500 mph and they are addressed by the turbofan.

There is energy wasted because the propelling jet is going much faster rearwards than the aircraft is going forwards, leaving a very fast wake. The kinetic energy of the wake is a reflection of the fuel used to produce the wake rather than fuel used to move the aircraft forwards and, as such, is fuel wasted. However, it is a fundamental aspect of producing thrust in a fluid by accelerating some of it rearwards whether by a propeller or a combustor in a duct (ramjet) and, as such, can only be reduced and not eliminated. The turbofan reduces the speed of the propelling jet.

The other penalty is present because any action to reduce the fuel consumption of the engine by increasing its pressure ratio or turbine temperature causes a corresponding increase in pressure and temperature in the exhaust duct which in turn cause a higher gas speed from the propelling nozzle (and higher KE and wasted fuel). Although the engine uses less fuel to produce a pound of thrust more fuel is wasted in the faster propelling jet. In other words, the independence of thermal and propulsive efficiencies, as exists with the piston engine/propeller combination which preceded the turbojet, is lost. In contrast, Roth considers regaining this independence the single most important feature of the turbofan which allows specific thrust to be chosen independently of the gas generator cycle.

The working substance of the thermodynamic cycle is the only mass accelerated to produce thrust in a turbojet which is a serious limitation (high fuel consumption) for aircraft speeds below supersonic. For subsonic flight speeds the speed of the propelling jet has to be reduced because there is a price to be paid in producing the thrust. The energy required to accelerate the gas inside the engine (increase in kinetic energy) is expended in two ways, by producing a change in momentum ( ie a force), and a wake which is an unavoidable consequence of producing thrust by an airbreathing engine (or propeller). The wake velocity, and fuel burned to produce it, can be reduced and the required thrust still maintained by increasing the mass accelerated. A turbofan does this by transferring energy available inside the engine, from the gas generator, to a ducted fan which produces a second, additional mass of accelerated air.

The transfer of energy from the core to bypass air results in lower pressure and temperature gas entering the core nozzle (lower exhaust velocity) and fan-produced temperature and pressure entering the fan nozzle. The amount of energy transferred depends on how much pressure rise the fan is designed to produce (fan pressure ratio). The best energy exchange (lowest fuel consumption) between the two flows, and how the jet velocities compare, depends on how efficiently the transfer takes place which depends on the losses in the fan-turbine and fan.

The fan flow has lower exhaust velocity, giving much more thrust per unit energy (lower specific thrust). Both airstreams contribute to the gross thrust of the engine. The additional air for the bypass stream increases the ram drag in the air intake stream-tube, but there is still a significant increase in net thrust. The overall effective exhaust velocity of the two exhaust jets can be made closer to a normal subsonic aircraft's flight speed and gets closer to the ideal Froude efficiency. A turbofan accelerates a larger mass of air more slowly, compared to a turbojet which accelerates a smaller amount more quickly, which is a less efficient way to generate the same thrust (see the efficiency section below).

The ratio of the mass-flow of air bypassing the engine core compared to the mass-flow of air passing through the core is referred to as the bypass ratio. Engines with more jet thrust relative to fan thrust are known as low-bypass turbofans, those that have considerably more fan thrust than jet thrust are known as high-bypass. Most commercial aviation jet engines in use today are high-bypass, and most modern fighter engines are low-bypass. Afterburners are used on low-bypass turbofans on combat aircraft.

Bypass ratio 

The bypass ratio (BPR) of a turbofan engine is the ratio between the mass flow rate of the bypass stream to the mass flow rate entering the core. A bypass ratio of 6, for example, means that 6 times more air passes through the bypass duct than the amount that passes through the combustion chamber.

Turbofan engines are usually described in terms of BPR, which together with overall pressure ratio, turbine inlet temperature and fan pressure ratio are important design parameters. In addition BPR is quoted for turboprop and unducted fan installations because their high propulsive efficiency gives them the overall efficiency characteristics of very high bypass turbofans. This allows them to be shown together with turbofans on plots which show trends of reducing specific fuel consumption (SFC) with increasing BPR. BPR can also be quoted for lift fan installations where the fan airflow is remote from the engine and doesn't flow past the engine core.

Considering a constant core (ie fixed pressure ratio and turbine inlet temperature), core and bypass jet velocities equal and a particular flight condition (ie Mach number and altitude) the fuel consumption per lb of thrust (sfc) decreases with increase in BPR. At the same time gross and net thrusts increase, but by different amounts. There is considerable potential for reducing fuel consumption for the same core cycle by increasing BPR.This is achieved because of the reduction in pounds of thrust per lb/sec of airflow (specific thrust) and the resultant reduction in lost kinetic energy in the jets (increase in propulsive efficiency).

If all the gas power from a gas turbine is converted to kinetic energy in a propelling nozzle, the aircraft is best suited to high supersonic speeds. If it is all transferred to a separate big mass of air with low kinetic energy, the aircraft is best suited to zero speed (hovering). For speeds in between, the gas power is shared between a separate airstream and the gas turbine's own nozzle flow in a proportion which gives the aircraft performance required. The trade off between mass flow and velocity is also seen with propellers and helicopter rotors by comparing disc loading and power loading. For example, the same helicopter weight can be supported by a high power engine and small diameter rotor or, for less fuel, a lower power engine and bigger rotor with lower velocity through the rotor.

Bypass usually refers to transferring gas power from a gas turbine to a bypass stream of air to reduce fuel consumption and jet noise. Alternatively, there may be a requirement for an afterburning engine where the sole requirement for bypass is to provide cooling air. This sets the lower limit for BPR and these engines have been called "leaky" or continuous bleed turbojets (General Electric YJ-101 BPR 0.25) and low BPR turbojets (Pratt & Whitney PW1120). Low BPR (0.2) has also been used to provide surge margin as well as afterburner cooling for the Pratt & Whitney J58.

Efficiency

Propeller engines are most efficient for low speeds, turbojet engines for high speeds, and turbofan engines between the two.

In a turbojet (zero-bypass) engine, the high temperature and high pressure exhaust gas is accelerated when it undergoes expansion through a propelling nozzle and produces all the thrust. The compressor absorbs the mechanical power produced by the turbine. In a bypass design, extra turbines drive a ducted fan that accelerates air rearward from the front of the engine. In a high-bypass design, the ducted fan and nozzle produce most of the thrust. Turbofans are closely related to turboprops in principle because both transfer some of the gas turbine's gas power, using extra machinery, to a bypass stream leaving less for the hot nozzle to convert to kinetic energy. Turbofans represent an intermediate stage between turbojets, which derive all their thrust from exhaust gases, and turbo-props which derive minimal thrust from exhaust gases (typically 10% or less). Extracting shaft power and transferring it to a bypass stream introduces extra losses which are more than made up by the improved propulsive efficiency. The turboprop at its best flight speed gives significant fuel savings over a turbojet even though an extra turbine, a gearbox and a propeller are added to the turbojet's low-loss propelling nozzle. The turbofan has additional losses from its greater number of compressor stages/blades, fan and bypass duct.

Froude, or Propulsive, Efficiency can be defined as:

where:

Thrust
While a turbojet engine uses all of the engine's output to produce thrust in the form of a hot high-velocity exhaust gas jet, a turbofan's cool low-velocity bypass air yields between 30% and 70% of the total thrust produced by a turbofan system.

The thrust (FN) generated by a turbofan depends on the effective exhaust velocity of the total exhaust, as with any jet engine, but because two exhaust jets are present the thrust equation can be expanded as:

where:

Nozzles
The cold duct and core duct's nozzle systems are relatively complex due to the use of two separate exhaust flows. In high bypass engines, the fan is situated in a short duct near the front of the engine and typically has a convergent cold nozzle, with the tail of the duct forming a low pressure ratio nozzle that under normal conditions will choke creating supersonic flow patterns around the core. The core nozzle is more conventional, but generates less of the thrust, and depending on design choices, such as noise considerations, may conceivably not choke. In low bypass engines the two flows may combine within the ducts, and share a common nozzle, which can be fitted with afterburner.

Noise 

Most of the air flow through a high-bypass turbofan is lower-velocity bypass flow: even when combined with the much-higher-velocity engine exhaust, the average exhaust velocity is considerably lower than in a pure turbojet. Turbojet engine noise is predominately jet noise from the high exhaust velocity. Therefore, turbofan engines are significantly quieter than a pure-jet of the same thrust, and jet noise is no longer the predominant source. Turbofan engine noise propagates both upstream via the inlet and downstream via the primary nozzle and the by-pass duct. Other noise sources are the fan, compressor and turbine.

Fan noise may come from the interaction of the fan-blade wakes with the pressure field of the downstream fan-exit stator vanes. It may be minimized by adequate axial spacing between blade trailing edge and stator entrance.
At high engine speeds, as at takeoff, shock waves from the supersonic fan tips, because of their unequal nature, produce noise of a discordant nature known as "buzz saw" noise.

All modern turbofan engines have acoustic liners in the nacelle to damp their noise. They extend as much as possible to cover the largest surface area. The acoustic performance of the engine can be experimentally evaluated by means of ground tests or in dedicated experimental test rigs.

In the aerospace industry, chevrons are the "saw-tooth" patterns on the trailing edges of some jet engine nozzles that are used for noise reduction. The shaped edges smooth the mixing of hot air from the engine core and cooler air flowing through the engine fan, which reduces noise-creating turbulence. Chevrons were developed by GE under a NASA contract. Some notable examples of such designs are Boeing 787 and Boeing 747-8 on the Rolls-Royce Trent 1000 and General Electric GEnx engines.

History

Early turbojet engines were not very fuel-efficient because their overall pressure ratio and turbine inlet temperature were severely limited by the technology and materials available at the time.

The first turbofan engine, which was only run on a test bed, was the German Daimler-Benz DB 670, designated the 109-007 by the Nazi Ministry of Aviation, with a first run date of 27 May 1943, after the testing of the turbomachinery using an electric motor, which had been undertaken on 1 April 1943. Development of the engine was abandoned with its problems unsolved, as the war situation worsened for Germany.

Later in 1943, the British ground tested the Metrovick F.3 turbofan, which used the Metrovick F.2 turbojet as a gas generator with the exhaust discharging into a close-coupled aft-fan module comprising a contra-rotating LP turbine system driving two co-axial contra-rotating fans.

Improved materials, and the introduction of twin compressors, such as in the Bristol Olympus, and Pratt & Whitney JT3C engines, increased the overall pressure ratio and thus the thermodynamic efficiency of engines. They also had poor propulsive efficiency, because pure turbojets have a high specific thrust/high velocity exhaust, which is better suited to supersonic flight.

The original low-bypass turbofan engines were designed to improve propulsive efficiency by reducing the exhaust velocity to a value closer to that of the aircraft. The Rolls-Royce Conway, the world's first production turbofan, had a bypass ratio of 0.3, similar to the modern General Electric F404 fighter engine. Civilian turbofan engines of the 1960s, such as the Pratt & Whitney JT8D and the Rolls-Royce Spey, had bypass ratios closer to 1 and were similar to their military equivalents.

The first Soviet airliner powered by turbofan engines was the Tupolev Tu-124 introduced in 1962. It used the Soloviev D-20. 164 aircraft were produced between 1960 and 1965 for Aeroflot and other Eastern Bloc airlines, with some operating until the early 1990s.

The first General Electric turbofan was the aft-fan CJ805-23, based on the CJ805-3 turbojet. It was followed by the aft-fan General Electric CF700 engine, with a 2.0 bypass ratio. The CF700 was the first small turbofan to be certified by the Federal Aviation Administration (FAA). There were at one time over 400 CF700 aircraft in operation around the world, with an experience base of over 10 million service hours. The CF700 turbofan engine was also used to train Moon-bound astronauts in Project Apollo as the powerplant for the Lunar Landing Research Vehicle.

Common types

Low-bypass turbofan

A high-specific-thrust/low-bypass-ratio turbofan normally has a multi-stage fan behind inlet guide vanes, developing a relatively high pressure ratio and, thus, yielding a high (mixed or cold) exhaust velocity. The core airflow needs to be large enough to ensure there is sufficient core power to drive the fan. A smaller core flow/higher bypass ratio cycle can be achieved by raising the inlet temperature of the high-pressure (HP) turbine rotor.

To illustrate one aspect of how a turbofan differs from a turbojet, comparisons can be made at the same airflow (to keep a common intake for example) and the same net thrust (i.e. same specific thrust). A bypass flow can be added only if the turbine inlet temperature is not too high to compensate for the smaller core flow. Future improvements in turbine cooling/material technology can allow higher turbine inlet temperature, which is necessary because of increased cooling air temperature, resulting from an overall pressure ratio increase.

The resulting turbofan, with reasonable efficiencies and duct loss for the added components, would probably operate at a higher nozzle pressure ratio than the turbojet, but with a lower exhaust temperature to retain net thrust. Since the temperature rise across the whole engine (intake to nozzle) would be lower, the (dry power) fuel flow would also be reduced, resulting in a better specific fuel consumption (SFC).

Some low-bypass ratio military turbofans (e.g. F404, JT8D) have variable inlet guide vanes to direct air onto the first fan rotor stage. This improves the fan surge margin (see compressor map).

Afterburning turbofan 

Since the 1970s, most jet fighter engines have been low/medium bypass turbofans with a mixed exhaust, afterburner and variable area exit nozzle. An afterburner is a combustor located downstream of the turbine blades and directly upstream of the nozzle, which burns fuel from afterburner-specific fuel injectors. When lit, large volumes of fuel are burnt in the afterburner, raising the temperature of exhaust gases by a significant degree, resulting in a higher exhaust velocity/engine specific thrust. The variable geometry nozzle must open to a larger throat area to accommodate the extra volume and increased flow rate when the afterburner is lit. Afterburning is often designed to give a significant thrust boost for take off, transonic acceleration and combat maneuvers, but is very fuel intensive. Consequently, afterburning can be used only for short portions of a mission.

At a fixed total applied fuel:air ratio, the total fuel flow for a given fan airflow will be the same, regardless of the dry specific thrust of the engine. However, a high specific thrust turbofan will, by definition, have a higher nozzle pressure ratio, resulting in a higher afterburning net thrust and, therefore, a lower afterburning specific fuel consumption (SFC). However, high specific thrust engines have a high dry SFC. The situation is reversed for a medium specific thrust afterburning turbofan: i.e., poor afterburning SFC/good dry SFC. The former engine is suitable for a combat aircraft which must remain in afterburning combat for a fairly long period, but has to fight only fairly close to the airfield (e.g. cross border skirmishes). The latter engine is better for an aircraft that has to fly some distance, or loiter for a long time, before going into combat. However, the pilot can afford to stay in afterburning only for a short period, before aircraft fuel reserves become dangerously low.

The first production afterburning turbofan engine was the Pratt & Whitney TF30, which initially powered the F-111 Aardvark and F-14 Tomcat. Current low-bypass military turbofans include the Pratt & Whitney F119, the Eurojet EJ200, the General Electric F110, the Klimov RD-33, and the Saturn AL-31, all of which feature a mixed exhaust, afterburner and variable area propelling nozzle.

High-bypass turbofan 

To further improve fuel economy and reduce noise, almost all of today's jet airliners and most military transport aircraft (e.g., the C-17) are powered by low-specific-thrust/high-bypass-ratio turbofans. These engines evolved from the high-specific-thrust/low-bypass-ratio turbofans used in such aircraft in the 1960s. Modern combat aircraft tend to use low-bypass ratio turbofans, and some military transport aircraft use turboprops.

Low specific thrust is achieved by replacing the multi-stage fan with a single-stage unit. Unlike some military engines, modern civil turbofans lack stationary inlet guide vanes in front of the fan rotor. The fan is scaled to achieve the desired net thrust.

The core (or gas generator) of the engine must generate enough power to drive the fan at its rated mass flow and pressure ratio. Improvements in turbine cooling/material technology allow for a higher (HP) turbine rotor inlet temperature, which allows a smaller (and lighter) core, potentially improving the core thermal efficiency. Reducing the core mass flow tends to increase the load on the LP turbine, so this unit may require additional stages to reduce the average stage loading and to maintain LP turbine efficiency. Reducing core flow also increases bypass ratio. Bypass ratios greater than 5:1 are increasingly common; the Pratt & Whitney PW1000G, which entered commercial service in 2016, attains 12.5:1.

Further improvements in core thermal efficiency can be achieved by raising the overall pressure ratio of the core. Improvements in blade aerodynamics can reduce the number of extra compressor stages required, and variable geometry (i.e., stators) enable high-pressure-ratio compressors to work surge-free at all throttle settings.

The first (experimental) high-bypass turbofan engine was the AVCO-Lycoming PLF1A-2, a T55 turboshaft-derived engine that was first run in February 1962. The General Electric TF39 became the first production model, designed to power the Lockheed C-5 Galaxy military transport aircraft. The civil General Electric CF6 engine used a derived design. Other high-bypass turbofans are the Pratt & Whitney JT9D, the three-shaft Rolls-Royce RB211 and the CFM International CFM56; also the smaller TF34. More recent large high-bypass turbofans include the Pratt & Whitney PW4000, the three-shaft Rolls-Royce Trent, the General Electric GE90/GEnx and the GP7000, produced jointly by GE and P&W.

The lower the specific thrust of a turbofan, the lower the mean jet outlet velocity, which in turn translates into a high thrust lapse rate (i.e. decreasing thrust with increasing flight speed). See technical discussion below, item 2. Consequently, an engine sized to propel an aircraft at high subsonic flight speed (e.g., Mach 0.83) generates a relatively high thrust at low flight speed, thus enhancing runway performance. Low specific thrust engines tend to have a high bypass ratio, but this is also a function of the temperature of the turbine system.

The turbofans on twin-engined transport aircraft produce enough take-off thrust to continue a take-off on one engine if the other engine shuts down after a critical point in the take-off run. From that point on the aircraft has less than half the thrust compared to two operating engines because the non-functioning engine is a source of drag. Modern twin engined airliners normally climb very steeply immediately after take-off. If one engine shuts down, the climb-out is much shallower, but sufficient to clear obstacles in the flightpath.

The Soviet Union's engine technology was less advanced than the West's, and its first wide-body aircraft, the Ilyushin Il-86, was powered by low-bypass engines. The Yakovlev Yak-42, a medium-range, rear-engined aircraft seating up to 120 passengers, introduced in 1980, was the first Soviet aircraft to use high-bypass engines.

Turbofan configurations
Turbofan engines come in a variety of engine configurations. For a given engine cycle (i.e., same airflow, bypass ratio, fan pressure ratio, overall pressure ratio and HP turbine rotor inlet temperature), the choice of turbofan configuration has little impact upon the design point performance (e.g., net thrust, SFC), as long as overall component performance is maintained. Off-design performance and stability is, however, affected by engine configuration.

The basic element of a turbofan is a spool, a single combination of fan/compressor, turbine and shaft rotating at a single speed. For a given pressure ratio, the surge margin can be increased by two different design paths:

 Splitting the compressor into two smaller spools rotating at different speeds, as with the Pratt & Whitney J57; or
 Making the stator vane pitch adjustable, typically in the front stages, as with the J79.

Most modern western civil turbofans employ a relatively high-pressure-ratio high-pressure (HP) compressor, with many rows of variable stators to control surge margin at low rpm. In the three-spool RB211/Trent the core compression system is split into two, with the IP compressor, which supercharges the HP compressor, being on a different coaxial shaft and driven by a separate (IP) turbine. As the HP compressor has a modest pressure ratio its speed can be reduced surge-free, without employing variable geometry. However, because a shallow IP compressor working line is inevitable, the IPC has one stage of variable geometry on all variants except the −535, which has none.

Single-shaft turbofan
Although far from common, the single-shaft turbofan is probably the simplest configuration, comprising a fan and high-pressure compressor driven by a single turbine unit, all on the same spool. The Snecma M53, which powers Dassault Mirage 2000 fighter aircraft, is an example of a single-shaft turbofan. Despite the simplicity of the turbomachinery configuration, the M53 requires a variable area mixer to facilitate part-throttle operation.

Aft-fan turbofan
One of the earliest turbofans was a derivative of the General Electric J79 turbojet, known as the CJ805-23, which featured an integrated aft fan/low-pressure (LP) turbine unit located in the turbojet exhaust jetpipe. Hot gas from the turbojet turbine exhaust expanded through the LP turbine, the fan blades being a radial extension of the turbine blades. This arrangement introduces an additional gas leakage path compared to a front-fan configuration and was a problem with this engine with higher-pressure turbine gas leaking into the fan airflow. An aft-fan configuration was later used for the General Electric GE36 UDF (propfan) demonstrator of the early 1980s. 

In 1971 a concept was put forward by the NASA Lewis Research Center for a supersonic transport engine which operated as an aft-fan turbofan at take-off and subsonic speeds and a turbojet at higher speeds. This would give the low noise and high thrust characteristics of a turbofan at take-off, together with turbofan high propulsive efficiency at subsonic flight speeds. It would have the high propulsive efficiency of a turbojet at supersonic cruise speeds.

Basic two-spool
Many turbofans have at least basic two-spool configuration where the fan is on a separate low pressure (LP) spool, running concentrically with the compressor or high pressure (HP) spool; the LP spool runs at a lower angular velocity, while the HP spool turns faster and its compressor further compresses part of the air for combustion. The BR710 is typical of this configuration. At the smaller thrust sizes, instead of all-axial blading, the HP compressor configuration may be axial-centrifugal (e.g., CFE CFE738), double-centrifugal or even diagonal/centrifugal (e.g. Pratt & Whitney Canada PW600).

Boosted two-spool
Higher overall pressure ratios can be achieved by either raising the HP compressor pressure ratio or adding compressor (non-bypass) stages or T-stages to the LP spool, between the fan and the HP compressor, to boost the latter. All of the large American turbofans (e.g. General Electric CF6, GE90, GE9X and GEnx plus Pratt & Whitney JT9D and PW4000) feature T-stages. The Rolls-Royce BR715 is a non-American example of this. The high bypass ratios used in modern civil turbofans tend to reduce the relative diameter of the T-stages, reducing their mean tip speed. Consequently, more T-stages are required to develop the necessary pressure rise.

Three-spool
Rolls-Royce chose a three-spool configuration for their large civil turbofans (i.e. the RB211 and Trent families), where the T-stages of the boosted two-spool configuration are separated into a separate intermediate pressure (IP) spool, driven by its own turbine. The first three-spool engine was the earlier Rolls-Royce RB.203 Trent of 1967.

The Garrett ATF3, powering the Dassault Falcon 20 business jet, has an unusual three spool layout with an aft spool not concentric with the two others.

Ivchenko Design Bureau chose the same configuration as Rolls-Royce for their Lotarev D-36 engine, followed by Lotarev/Progress D-18T and Progress D-436.

The Turbo-Union RB199 military turbofan also has a three-spool configuration, as do the military Kuznetsov NK-25 and NK-321.

Geared fan

As bypass ratio increases, the fan blade tip speed increases relative to the LPT blade speed. This will reduce the LPT blade speed, requiring more turbine stages to extract enough energy to drive the fan. Introducing a (planetary) reduction gearbox, with a suitable gear ratio, between the LP shaft and the fan enables both the fan and LP turbine to operate at their optimum speeds. Examples of this configuration are the long-established Garrett TFE731, the Honeywell ALF 502/507, and the recent Pratt & Whitney PW1000G.

Military turbofans
Most of the configurations discussed above are used in civilian turbofans, while modern military turbofans (e.g., Snecma M88) are usually basic two-spool.

High-pressure turbine
Most civil turbofans use a high-efficiency, 2-stage HP turbine to drive the HP compressor. The CFM International CFM56 uses an alternative approach: a single-stage, high-work unit. While this approach is probably less efficient, there are savings on cooling air, weight and cost.

In the RB211 and Trent 3-spool engine series, the HP compressor pressure ratio is modest so only a single HP turbine stage is required. Modern military turbofans also tend to use a single HP turbine stage and a modest HP compressor.

Low-pressure turbine
Modern civil turbofans have multi-stage LP turbines (anywhere from 3 to 7). The number of stages required depends on the engine cycle bypass ratio and the boost (on boosted two-spools). A geared fan may reduce the number of required LPT stages in some applications. Because of the much lower bypass ratios employed, military turbofans require only one or two LP turbine stages.

Overall performance

Cycle improvements

Consider a mixed turbofan with a fixed bypass ratio and airflow. Increasing the overall pressure ratio of the compression system raises the combustor entry temperature. Therefore, at a fixed fuel flow there is an increase in (HP) turbine rotor inlet temperature. Although the higher temperature rise across the compression system implies a larger temperature drop over the turbine system, the mixed nozzle temperature is unaffected, because the same amount of heat is being added to the system. There is, however, a rise in nozzle pressure, because overall pressure ratio increases faster than the turbine expansion ratio, causing an increase in the hot mixer entry pressure. Consequently, net thrust increases, whilst specific fuel consumption (fuel flow/net thrust) decreases. A similar trend occurs with unmixed turbofans.

Turbofan engines can be made more fuel efficient by raising overall pressure ratio and turbine rotor inlet temperature in unison. However, better turbine materials or improved vane/blade cooling are required to cope with increases in both turbine rotor inlet temperature and compressor delivery temperature. Increasing the latter may require better compressor materials.

The overall pressure ratio can be increased by improving fan (or) LP compressor pressure ratio or HP compressor pressure ratio. If the latter is held constant, the increase in (HP) compressor delivery temperature (from raising overall pressure ratio) implies an increase in HP mechanical speed. However, stressing considerations might limit this parameter, implying, despite an increase in overall pressure ratio, a reduction in HP compressor pressure ratio.

According to simple theory, if the ratio of turbine rotor inlet temperature/(HP) compressor delivery temperature is maintained, the HP turbine throat area can be retained. However, this assumes that cycle improvements are obtained, while retaining the datum (HP) compressor exit flow function (non-dimensional flow). In practice, changes to the non-dimensional speed of the (HP) compressor and cooling bleed extraction would probably make this assumption invalid, making some adjustment to HP turbine throat area unavoidable. This means the HP turbine nozzle guide vanes would have to be different from the original. In all probability, the downstream LP turbine nozzle guide vanes would have to be changed anyway.

Thrust growth

Thrust growth is obtained by increasing core power. There are two basic routes available:
 hot route: increase HP turbine rotor inlet temperature
 cold route: increase core mass flow

Both routes require an increase in the combustor fuel flow and, therefore, the heat energy added to the core stream.

The hot route may require changes in turbine blade/vane materials or better blade/vane cooling. The cold route can be obtained by one of the following:

 adding T-stages to the LP/IP compression
 adding a zero-stage to the HP compression
 improving the compression process, without adding stages (e.g. higher fan hub pressure ratio)

all of which increase both overall pressure ratio and core airflow.

Alternatively, the core size can be increased, to raise core airflow, without changing overall pressure ratio. This route is expensive, since a new (upflowed) turbine system (and possibly a larger IP compressor) is also required.

Changes must also be made to the fan to absorb the extra core power. On a civil engine, jet noise considerations mean that any significant increase in take-off thrust must be accompanied by a corresponding increase in fan mass flow (to maintain a T/O specific thrust of about 30 lbf/lb/s).

Technical discussion
 Specific thrust (net thrust/intake airflow) is an important parameter for turbofans and jet engines in general. Imagine a fan (driven by an appropriately sized electric motor) operating within a pipe, which is connected to a propelling nozzle. It is fairly obvious, the higher the fan pressure ratio (fan discharge pressure/fan inlet pressure), the higher the jet velocity and the corresponding specific thrust. Now imagine we replace this set-up with an equivalent turbofan – same airflow and same fan pressure ratio. Obviously, the core of the turbofan must produce sufficient power to drive the fan via the low-pressure (LP) turbine. If we choose a low (HP) turbine inlet temperature for the gas generator, the core airflow needs to be relatively high to compensate. The corresponding bypass ratio is therefore relatively low. If we raise the turbine inlet temperature, the core airflow can be smaller, thus increasing bypass ratio. Raising turbine inlet temperature tends to increase thermal efficiency and, therefore, improve fuel efficiency.
 Naturally, as altitude increases, there is a decrease in air density and, therefore, the net thrust of an engine. There is also a flight speed effect, termed thrust lapse rate. Consider the approximate equation for net thrust again: With a high specific thrust (e.g., fighter) engine, the jet velocity is relatively high, so intuitively one can see that increases in flight velocity have less of an impact upon net thrust than a medium specific thrust (e.g., trainer) engine, where the jet velocity is lower. The impact of thrust lapse rate upon a low specific thrust (e.g., civil) engine is even more severe. At high flight speeds, high-specific-thrust engines can pick up net thrust through the ram rise in the intake, but this effect tends to diminish at supersonic speeds because of shock wave losses.
 Thrust growth on civil turbofans is usually obtained by increasing fan airflow, thus preventing the jet noise becoming too high. However, the larger fan airflow requires more power from the core. This can be achieved by raising the overall pressure ratio (combustor inlet pressure/intake delivery pressure) to induce more airflow into the core and by increasing turbine inlet temperature. Together, these parameters tend to increase core thermal efficiency and improve fuel efficiency.
 Some high-bypass-ratio civil turbofans use an extremely low area ratio (less than 1.01), convergent-divergent, nozzle on the bypass (or mixed exhaust) stream, to control the fan working line. The nozzle acts as if it has variable geometry. At low flight speeds the nozzle is unchoked (less than a Mach number of unity), so the exhaust gas speeds up as it approaches the throat and then slows down slightly as it reaches the divergent section. Consequently, the nozzle exit area controls the fan match and, being larger than the throat, pulls the fan working line slightly away from surge. At higher flight speeds, the ram rise in the intake increases nozzle pressure ratio to the point where the throat becomes choked (M=1.0). Under these circumstances, the throat area dictates the fan match and, being smaller than the exit, pushes the fan working line slightly towards surge. This is not a problem, since fan surge margin is much better at high flight speeds.
 The off-design behaviour of turbofans is illustrated under compressor map and turbine map.
 Because modern civil turbofans operate at low specific thrust, they require only a single fan stage to develop the required fan pressure ratio. The desired overall pressure ratio for the engine cycle is usually achieved by multiple axial stages on the core compression. Rolls-Royce tend to split the core compression into two with an intermediate pressure (IP) supercharging the HP compressor, both units being driven by turbines with a single stage, mounted on separate shafts. Consequently, the HP compressor need develop only a modest pressure ratio (e.g., ~4.5:1). US civil engines use much higher HP compressor pressure ratios (e.g., ~23:1 on the General Electric GE90) and tend to be driven by a two-stage HP turbine. Even so, there are usually a few IP axial stages mounted on the LP shaft, behind the fan, to further supercharge the core compression system. Civil engines have multi-stage LP turbines, the number of stages being determined by the bypass ratio, the amount of IP compression on the LP shaft and the LP turbine blade speed.
 Because military engines usually have to be able to fly very fast at sea level, the limit on HP compressor delivery temperature is reached at a fairly modest design overall pressure ratio, compared with that of a civil engine. Also the fan pressure ratio is relatively high, to achieve a medium to high specific thrust. Consequently, modern military turbofans usually have only 5 or 6 HP compressor stages and require only a single-stage HP turbine. Low-bypass-ratio military turbofans usually have one LP turbine stage, but higher bypass ratio engines need two stages. In theory, by adding IP compressor stages, a modern military turbofan HP compressor could be used in a civil turbofan derivative, but the core would tend to be too small for high thrust applications.

Improvements

Aerodynamic modelling 

Aerodynamics is a mix of subsonic, transonic and supersonic airflow on a single fan/gas compressor blade in a modern turbofan. The airflow past the blades has to be maintained within close angular limits to keep the air flowing against an increasing pressure. Otherwise the air will come back out of the intake.

The Full Authority Digital Engine Control (FADEC) needs accurate data for controlling the engine. Therefore, during development of a new engine type a relation is established between a more easily measured temperature like exhaust gas temperature and the TIT. Monitoring the exhaust gas temperature is then used to make sure the engine does not run too hot.

Blade technology 

Exotic alloys, sophisticated air cooling schemes and special mechanical design are needed to keep the physical stresses within the strength of the material.
Rotating seals must withstand harsh conditions for 10 years, 20,000 missions and rotating at 10 to 20,000 rpm.

Fan blades 

Fan blades have been growing as jet engines have been getting bigger: each fan blade carries the equivalent of nine double-decker buses and swallows air the equivalent volume of a squash court every second.
Advances in computational fluid dynamics (CFD) modelling have permitted complex, 3D curved shapes with very wide chord, keeping the fan capabilities while minimizing the blade count to lower costs.
Coincidentally, the bypass ratio grew to achieve higher propulsive efficiency and the fan diameter increased.

Rolls-Royce pioneered the hollow, titanium wide-chord fan blade in the 1980s for aerodynamic efficiency and foreign object damage resistance in the RB211 then for the Trent.
GE Aviation introduced carbon fiber composite fan blades on the GE90 in 1995, manufactured today with a carbon-fiber tape-layer process.
GE partner Safran developed a 3D woven technology with Albany Composites for the CFM56 and CFM LEAP engines.

Future progress 

Engine cores are shrinking as they are operating at higher pressure ratios and becoming more efficient, and become smaller compared to the fan as bypass ratios increase.

For Pratt & Whitney VP technology and environment Alan Epstein "Over the history of commercial aviation, we have gone from 20% to 40% [cruise efficiency], and there is a consensus among the engine community that we can probably get to 60%".

Geared turbofans and further fan pressure ratio reductions will continue to improve propulsive efficiency.
The second phase of the FAA's Continuous Lower Energy, Emissions and Noise (CLEEN) program is targeting for the late 2020s reductions of 33% fuel burn, 60% emissions and 32 dB EPNdb noise compared with the 2000s state-of-the-art.
In summer 2017 at NASA Glenn Research Center in Cleveland, Ohio, Pratt has finished testing a very-low-pressure-ratio fan on a PW1000G, resembling an open rotor with fewer blades than the PW1000G's 20.

The weight and size of the nacelle would be reduced by a short duct inlet, imposing higher aerodynamic turning loads on the blades and leaving less space for soundproofing, but a lower-pressure-ratio fan is slower.
UTC Aerospace Systems Aerostructures will have a full-scale ground test in 2019 of its low-drag Integrated Propulsion System with a thrust reverser, improving fuel burn by 1% and with 2.5-3 EPNdB lower noise.

Safran can probably deliver another 10–15% in fuel efficiency through the mid-2020s before reaching an asymptote, and next will have to introduce a breakthrough: to increase the bypass ratio to 35:1 instead of 11:1 for the CFM LEAP, it is demonstrating a counterrotating open rotor unducted fan (propfan) in Istres, France, under the European Clean Sky technology program.
Modeling advances and high specific strength materials may help it succeed where previous attempts failed.
When noise levels will be within current standards and similar to the Leap engine, 15% lower fuel burn will be available and for that Safran is testing its controls, vibration and operation, while airframe integration is still challenging.

For GE Aviation, the energy density of jet fuel still maximises the Breguet range equation and higher pressure ratio cores; lower pressure ratio fans, low-loss inlets and lighter structures can further improve thermal, transfer and propulsive efficiency.
Under the U.S. Air Force’s Adaptive Engine Transition Program, adaptive thermodynamic cycles will be used for the sixth-generation jet fighter, based on a modified Brayton cycle and Constant volume combustion.
Additive manufacturing in the advanced turboprop will reduce weight by 5% and fuel burn by 20%.

Rotating and static ceramic matrix composite (CMC) parts operates  hotter than metal and are one-third its weight.
With $21.9 million from the Air Force Research Laboratory, GE is investing $200 million in a CMC facility in Huntsville, Alabama, in addition to its Asheville, North Carolina site, mass-producing silicon carbide matrix with silicon-carbide fibers in 2018.
CMCs will be used ten times more by the mid-2020s: the CFM LEAP requires 18 CMC turbine shrouds per engine and the GE9X will use it in the combustor and for 42 HP turbine nozzles.

Nearly stoichiometric turbine entry temperatures approaches the theoretical limit and its impact on emissions has to be balanced with environmental performance goals.
Open rotors, lower pressure ratio fans and potentially distributed propulsion offer more room for better propulsive efficiency.
Exotic cycles, heat exchangers and pressure gain/constant volume combustion can improve thermodynamic efficiency.
Additive manufacturing could be an enabler for intercooler and recuperators.
Closer airframe integration and hybrid or electric aircraft can be combined with gas turbines.

Current Rolls-Royce engines have a 72–82% propulsive efficiency and 42–49% thermal efficiency for a  TSFC at Mach 0.8, and aim for theoretical limits of 95% for open rotor propulsive efficiency and 60% for thermal efficiency with stoichiometric turbine entry temperature and 80:1 overall pressure ratio for a  TSFC

As teething troubles may not show up until several thousand hours, the latest turbofans technical problems disrupt airlines operations and manufacturers deliveries while production rates are rising sharply.
Trent 1000 cracked blades grounded almost 50 Boeing 787s and reduced ETOPS to 2.3 hours down from 5.5, costing Rolls-Royce plc almost $950 million.
PW1000G knife-edge seal fractures have caused Pratt & Whitney to fall way behind in deliveries, leaving about 100 engineless A320neos waiting for their powerplants.
The CFM LEAP introduction was smoother but a ceramic composite  Turbine coating is prematurely lost, necessitating a new design, causing 60 A320neo engine removal for modification, as deliveries are up to six weeks late.

On a widebody, Safran estimates 5–10% of fuel could be saved by reducing power intake for hydraulic systems, while swapping to electrical power could save 30% of weight, as initiated on the Boeing 787, while Rolls-Royce plc hopes for up to 5%.

Manufacturers

The turbofan engine market is dominated by General Electric, Rolls-Royce plc and Pratt & Whitney, in order of market share. General Electric and SNECMA of France have a joint venture, CFM International. Pratt & Whitney also have a joint venture, International Aero Engines with Japanese Aero Engine Corporation and MTU Aero Engines of Germany, specializing in engines for the Airbus A320 family. Pratt & Whitney and General Electric have a joint venture, Engine Alliance selling a range of engines for aircraft such as the Airbus A380.

For airliners and cargo aircraft, the in-service fleet in 2016 is 60,000 engines and should grow to 103,000 in 2035 with 86,500 deliveries according to Flight Global. A majority will be medium-thrust engines for narrow-body aircraft with 54,000 deliveries, for a fleet growing from 28,500 to 61,000. High-thrust engines for wide-body aircraft, worth 40–45% of the market by value, will grow from 12,700 engines to over 21,000 with 18,500 deliveries. The regional jet engines below 20,000 lb (89 kN) fleet will grow from 7,500 to 9,000 and the fleet of turboprops for airliners will increase from 9,400 to 10,200. The manufacturers market share should be led by CFM with 44% followed by Pratt & Whitney with 29% and then Rolls-Royce and General Electric with 10% each.

Commercial turbofans in production

Extreme bypass jet engines

In the 1970s, Rolls-Royce/SNECMA tested a M45SD-02 turbofan fitted with variable-pitch fan blades to improve handling at ultralow fan pressure ratios and to provide thrust reverse down to zero aircraft speed. The engine was aimed at ultraquiet STOL aircraft operating from city-centre airports.

In a bid for increased efficiency with speed, a development of the turbofan and turboprop known as a propfan engine was created that had an unducted fan. The fan blades are situated outside of the duct, so that it appears like a turboprop with wide scimitar-like blades. Both General Electric and Pratt & Whitney/Allison demonstrated propfan engines in the 1980s. Excessive cabin noise and relatively cheap jet fuel prevented the engines being put into service. The Progress D-27 propfan, developed in the U.S.S.R., was the only propfan engine equipped on a production aircraft.

Terminology
 Afterburner jetpipe equipped for afterburning
 Augmentor afterburner for turbofan with burning in hot and cold flows
 Bypass that part of the engine as distinct from the core in terms of components and airflow, eg that part of fan blading (fan outer) and stators which pass bypass air, bypass duct, bypass nozzle
 Bypass ratio bypass air mass flow /core air mass flow
 Core that part of the engine as distinct from the bypass in terms of components and airflow, eg core cowl, core nozzle, core airflow and associated machinery,  combustor and fuel system
 Core power also known as "available energy" or "gas horsepower". It is used to measure the theoretical (isentropic expansion) shaft work available from a gas generator or core by expanding hot, high pressure gas to ambient pressure. Since the power depends on the pressure and temperature of the gas (and the ambient pressure) a related figure of merit for thrust-producing engines is one which measures the thrust-producing potential from hot, high pressure gas and known as "stream thrust". It is obtained by calculating the velocity obtained with isentropic expansion to atmospheric pressure. The significance of the thrust obtained appears when multiplied by the aircraft velocity to give the thrust work. The thrust work which is potentially available is far less than the gas horsepower due to the increasing waste in the exhaust kinetic energy with increasing pressure and temperature before expansion to atmospheric pressure. The two are related by the propulsive efficiency, a measure of the energy wasted as a result of producing a force (ie thrust) in a fluid by increasing the speed (ie momentum) of the fluid.
 Dry engine ratings/ throttle lever positions below afterburning selection
 EGT exhaust gas temperature
 EPR engine pressure ratio
 Fan turbofan LP compressor
 Fanjet turbofan or aircraft powered by turbofan (colloquial)
 Fan pressure ratio fan outlet total pressure/fan inlet total pressure
 Flex temp At reduced take-off weights commercial aircraft can use reduced thrust which increases engine life and reduces maintenance costs. Flex temperature is a higher than actual outside air temperature (OAT) which is input to the engine monitoring computer to achieve the required reduced thrust (also known as "assumed temperature thrust reduction").
 Gas generator that part of the engine core which provides the hot, high pressure gas for fan-driving turbines (turbofan), for propelling nozzles (turbojet), for propeller- and rotor-driving turbines (turboprop and turboshaft), for industrial and marine power turbines
 HP high-pressure
 Intake ram drag Loss in momentum of engine stream tube from freestream to intake entrance, ie amount of energy imparted to air required to accelerate air from a stationary atmosphere to aircraft speed.
 IEPR integrated engine pressure ratio
 IP intermediate pressure
 LP low-pressure
 Net thrust nozzle thrust in stationary air (gross thrust) – engine stream tube ram drag (loss in momentum from freestream to intake entrance, ie amount of energy imparted to air required to accelerate air from a stationary atmosphere to aircraft speed). This is the thrust acting on the airframe.
 Overall pressure ratio combustor inlet total pressure/intake delivery total pressure
 Overall efficiency thermal efficiency * propulsive efficiency
 Propulsive efficiency propulsive power/rate of production of propulsive kinetic energy (maximum propulsive efficiency occurs when jet velocity equals flight velocity, which implies zero net thrust!)
 Specific fuel consumption (SFC) total fuel flow/net thrust (proportional to flight velocity/overall thermal efficiency) 
 Spooling up increase in RPM (colloquial)
 Stage loading For a turbine, the purpose of which is to produce power, the loading is an indicator of power developed per lb/sec of gas (specific power). A turbine stage turns the gas from an axial direction and speeds it up (in the nozzle guide vanes) to turn the rotor most effectively ( rotor blades must produce high lift), the proviso being that this is done efficiently, ie with acceptable losses. For a compressor stage, the purpose of which is to produce a pressure rise, a diffusion process is used. How much diffusion may be allowed ( and pressure rise obtained) before unacceptable flow separation occurs (ie losses) may be regarded as a loading limit.  
 Static pressure pressure of the fluid which is associated not with its motion but with its state or, alternatively, pressure due to the random motion of the fluid molecules that would be felt or measured if moving with the flow
 Specific thrust net thrust/intake airflow
 Thermal efficiency rate of production of propulsive kinetic energy/fuel power
 Total fuel flow combustor (plus any afterburner) fuel flow rate (e.g., lb/s or g/s)
 Total pressure static pressure plus kinetic energy term
 Turbine rotor inlet temperature maximum cycle temperature, ie temperature at which work transfer takes place

See also
 Jet engine
 Turbojet
 Turboprop
 Turboshaft
 Propfan
 Axial fan design
 Variable cycle engine
 Jet engine performance
 Gas turbine
 Turbine engine failure

References

External links

Wikibooks: Jet propulsion
 
 
 
  and previous series

Gas turbines
Jet engines